Walbert may refer to 

Saint Waldebert
Kate Walbert, American writer
William Burton Walbert, American musician
Walbert, Missouri, a ghost town

See also
John Gualbert
Walberto Caicedo